Ramakrishna is a 2004 Indian Kannada language romantic comedy film directed by Om Sai Prakash and produced by K. Bala Mutthaiah. The film stars  V. Ravichandran, Jaggesh, Laila and Kaveri in the leading roles.

The film was a remake of Tamil film Aan Paavam (1985) directed and written by Pandiarajan. The film was also remade in Telugu as Naku Pellam Kavali. The music was composed by S. A. Rajkumar.

Cast 
 V. Ravichandran as Rama
 Jaggesh as Krishna
 Laila as Lakshmi 
 Kaveri as Seetha 
 Srinivasa Murthy as School Teacher Vishwanath 
 Doddanna as Shankrappa 
 Sadhu Kokila as Rowdy Ranganna 
 Om Sai Prakash
 Chitra Shenoy
 M. N. Lakshmi Devi 
 Thriller Manju
 Dharma
 G. K. Krishna 
 Bank Suresh 
 Rathnakar 
 Bangalore Nagesh 
 Mandeep Rai 
 Anand Rao 
 Master Karthik Sharma

Soundtrack 
The music was composed by S. A. Rajkumar and lyrics written by K. Kalyan. A total of 6 tracks have been composed for the film and the audio rights brought by Manoranjan Audio. "Halli Haadu" and "Muguthi Muthu" were reused from Rajkumar's own songs "Komma Komma" (Nuvvu Vastavani; Telugu) and "Mookuthi Muthazhagu" (Kannupadapoguthaiya; Tamil) respectively.

References

External links 

 Songs

2004 films
2000s Kannada-language films
Indian comedy films
Kannada remakes of Tamil films
Films scored by S. A. Rajkumar
Films directed by Sai Prakash
2004 comedy films